Idaea ochrata, the bright wave, is a moth of the family Geometridae. It is found in Europe.

The species has a wingspan of 21–24 mm. The adults fly at night from late June to early August in one generation .

The flight season refers to the British Isles. This may vary in other parts of the range.

External links

Bright wave at UK Moths

Sterrhini
Moths described in 1763
Moths of Europe
Taxa named by Giovanni Antonio Scopoli